The Sean gas field is a small natural gas and associated condensate field located in the UK sector of the North Sea,  off the Norfolk coast.

The field 
The Sean gas field is a natural gas field located in the North Sea and comprises three accumulations North Sean, South Sean and East Sean. It is named after the four partners at the time of its discovery: Shell, Esso, Allied Chemical and National Coal Board. The gas reservoir is a Rotliegendes sandstone 170–290 feet (52–88 metres) thick at a depth of 8,300 feet (2,530 m). North Sean was discovered in April 1969 and South Sean in January 1970 both are located in UK Block 49/25. The original determination of the gas in place amounted to 425 billion cubic feet (12.4 billion cubic metres).

Development 
The Sean field has been developed through a number of offshore platforms.

The East Sean field has not been developed.

Production 
Production from the field began in August 1986. Sean was operated as a peak shaving field with a maximum delivery of 600 MMSCFD (million standard cubic feet per day). Processing facilities comprise 3-phase separation and gas dehydration. Gas and associated condensate are transported via a 30-inch diameter pipeline to the Shell processing facility at the Bacton gas terminal, Norfolk.

The specification of third party gas for entry into the export gas pipeline was as follows:

In June 2015 Oranje-Nassau Energie (ONE) acquired a 50% interest in the Sean field from Shell. SSE E&P UK holds the remaining 50% interest. ONE became the operator of Sean.

See also 

 Indefatigable gas field

References 

Natural gas fields in the United Kingdom
North Sea energy